Kaboli may refer to:

People
Farzaneh Kaboli, Iranian dancer
Iraj Kaboli, Iranian writer
Mehrab Kaboli, fictional character in the Persian epic Shahnameh
Mohsen Kaboli, Iranian-German robotics scientist
Yadollah Kaboli Khansari, Iranian calligrapher

Places
 Kaboli, Hormozgan
 Kaboli, Razavi Khorasan
 Kaboli, Togo

See also

Karoli (name)